The approximately 39 small islets of Caroline Island, a crescent-shaped atoll located some  south of the Hawaiian Islands in the central Pacific,  surround a shallow central lagoon. Caroline Island's islets, which only rise a few meters above sea level, share a common geologic origin and consist of sand deposits and limestone rock set atop a coral reef.

Three large islets — Nake, Long, and South Islets — make up 68 percent of the land area. The remaining assembly of small islets, divided into four groupings, was surveyed during a 1988 ecological survey, conducted by Angela and Cameron Kepler; at that time, many of the thus-far-unnamed islets were given names of Polynesian derivation. Several of the smallest islets have been observed to appear or disappear entirely following major storms, and the shapes of some larger islets have changed significantly over the past century.

Flora, the most distinguishing feature of each islet, varies as a function of both islet size and prior human habitation. Larger islets support inward zones of shrub, primarily Tournefortia argentea, and the largest possess a central forested region usually dominated by groves of Pisonia grandis trees. Artifacts, including wells, homesites, and marae, on several islets, speak to prior human habitation, as do stands of non-indigenous Cocos palms; however, many islets have little or no evidence of human influence, despite past disturbance.



List of islet groups and single islets

List of islets

Details of islets

See also

 Desert island
 List of islands

References
  (Text of "Caroline Island" chapter online at)
 

Caroline Island
Caroline Island
Kiribati geography-related lists